Christian Prawda  (born 6 August 1982 in Wolfsberg) is an Austrian football player who plays for SV Austria Klagenfurt.

Career
He formerly played for FC Kärnten and ASV in Klagenfurt.

References

FC Kärnten players
Austrian footballers
1982 births
Living people
Association football defenders
People from Wolfsberg
Footballers from Carinthia (state)